Pseudolithoxus nicoi is a species of armored catfish endemic to Venezuela where it is found in the upper Negro and Casiquiare canal basins.  This species grows to a length of  SL.

References 
 

Ancistrini
Fish of Venezuela
Endemic fauna of Venezuela
Fish described in 2000
Taxa named by Jonathan W. Armbruster